The  is a dam on the Toyosawa River, a tributary of the Kitakami River system, located in the town of Shiwa, Iwate Prefecture in the Tōhoku region of  the island of Honshū, Japan. It completed in 1952.

History
The need for storage reservoirs in the Kitakami River valley for irrigation purposes was recognized by the Meiji government at the start of the 20th century, due to repeated crop failures and conflicts between various communities over water rights, dating even from the early Edo period. The river also suffered from severe environmental problems with acidic runoff from upstream mining operations. Plans for a series of dams was initiated in 1941 by the Ministry of Agriculture and Forestry, but all work was halted during World War II. The plan was revived after the war, and the Sannōkai Dam was the first to be constructed.

Design
The Sannōkai Dam was started in 1947 and was completed in 1952 as a 37.4-foot high earthen embankment dam. However, due to aging and concerns over safety, it was completely rebuilt starting in 1977 as a rock-fill dam, with its height raised to 61.5 meters. The new dam was completed in 2001.

References

Japan Commission on Large Dams. Dams in Japan: Past, Present and Future. CRC Press (2009).

External links

 photo page with data (
Official home page 

Dams in Iwate Prefecture
Dams completed in 2001
Embankment dams
Shiwa, Iwate